Attles is a surname. Notable people with the surname include:

Al Attles (born 1936), American basketball player and coach
Joseph Attles (1903–1990), American actor